The CERN East Area is important for test-beams. The programme was approved by the CERN Research Board in February 2012.

Irradiation Facility Research Programme

References

External Links 

 CERN-CHARM experiment record on INSPIRE-HEP

Particle experiments
Irradiation Facility
CERN facilities